Paape Maa Jeevanjyothi is an Indian Telugu language drama series airing on Star Maa from Monday to Saturday at 12:00 PM from 26 April 2021. It stars Pallavi Ramishetty, Priyatham and Baby Sahasra in lead roles. It is also available on digital streaming platform Disney+ Hotstar. The main plot of the series was taken from popular Bengali language television series Maa....Tomay Chara Ghum Ashena, which was aired on Star Jalsha from 19 October 2009 to 3 August 2014.

Synopsis 
It is the story of a mother, Jyothi(Pallavi Ramishetty) and her daughter, Jeevana(Baby Sahasra). At the age of 2 years Jeevana was kidnapped by Karpagam (Mahathi) and handed over to Mallika. Mallika (Bhavana Samanthula) raises Jeevana and names her Kutti. After some series of consequences, Mallika dies due to cancer and reveals truth to Kutti about her mother. Kutti decided to reveal truth to Surya (Priyatham) and Jeevana but failed because of Shambu's evil actions. Meanwhile, she made friendship with orphan girl Malli. Kutti hides the truth and introduces Malli as Jyothi and Surya's biological daughter Jeevana.

Cast

Main 

 Jyothi (2022 - present) as Jyothi
 Pallavi Ramisetty (2021 - 2022) as Jyothi: Raghavaiah's daughter; Kutti and Sreethan's mother; Surya's wife 
 Priyatham as Surya Prasad: Gowri Prasad and Hymavathi's son; Jyothi's husband; Kutti and Sreethan's father; Vishwa's elder brother
 Sahasra as Jeevana "Kutti": Surya and Jyothi's daughter; Sreethan's elder sister; Mallika's foster daughter
 Baby Maira as three-years-old Jeevana "Kutti"

Recurring 

 Preeti Nigam as Hymavathi – Gowri Prasad's wife; Surya and Vishwa's mother; Harsha, Jeevana and Sreethan's grandmother
 JL Srinivas as Gowri Prasad – Hymavathi's husband; Surya and Vishwa's father; Harsha, Jeevana and Sreethan's grandfather; Shambu's elder brother
 Mahathi as Karpagam aka Kannamma – Shambu's partner; Jeevana's kidnapper
 Lakshmi Raj as Shambu Prasad – Gowri Prasad's younger brother; Indhu's husband; Vamshi's father
 Sri Lalitha as Yamini Prasad – Gowri and Hymavathi's first daughter-in-law; Harsha's mother
 Bhavana Reddy as Indhumathi "Indhu" – Shambu's wife; Vamsi's mother
 Bhavana Samanthula as Mallika – Kutti's late adoptive mother
 Hritesh Avasty as Gowri Prasad and Hymavathi's eldest son; Surya and Vishwa's brother; Yamini's husbnad; Harsha's father
 Kushal Naidu as Vishwa Prasad – Gowri Prasad and Hymavathi's youngest son; Surya's brother; Priya's husband
 Shilpa Reddy as Priya – Vishwa's wife 
 Meka Ramakrishna as Ragavaiah – Jyothi's father
 Madhu Reddy as Manjari – Kutti's fake mother
 Ajay as Priya's father
 Ayesha as Tulasamma – Gowri Prasad's maid
 Master Sreethan as Sreethan Prasad – Jyothi and Surya's son; Jeevana's brother
 Master Abhiram as Harsha Prasad – Yamini's son
 Master Tanav as Vamshi Prasad – Shambu and Indu's son
 Aaradya as Malli – Fake Jeevana
 Vikram as Karapgam's henchman
 Jabardasth Ashok as Constable
 Jabardasth Ganesh as Constable
 Nandini as Priya's mother
 Unknown as Diwakar
 Sumith as Nishanth

Cameo appearances 

 Mukesh Gowda as Rishi (reprised his role from Guppedantha Manasu)
 Raksha Gowda as Vasu (reprised her role from Guppedantha Manasu)
 Arjun Ambati as Aditya (reprised his role from Devatha - Anubandhala Alayam)

Adaptations

References

External links 

 Paape Maa Jeevanajyothi on Disney+ Hotstar

Indian television soap operas
Indian television series
Serial drama television series
2021 Indian television series debuts
Telugu-language television shows
Indian drama television series
Star Maa original programming